In the Wake of the Flood is a 2010 documentary film produced in Canada by director Ron Mann and featuring author Margaret Atwood. The film follows Atwood on her unusual book tour for her novel The Year of the Flood.

The film premiered in Canada in October 2010, and had its U.S. West Coast premiere at the San Francisco Green Film Festival in March 2011.

References

External links
 
 

2010 films
Canadian documentary films
Films directed by Ron Mann
Documentary films about women writers
Margaret Atwood
2010 documentary films
Films shot in Greater Sudbury
2010s English-language films
2010s Canadian films